Namaste Tower is a  tall skyscraper mega project in Mumbai, India. It would have been a mixed-use skyscraper with 63 floors that will house a 380-room W Hotel, office and retail space. It was designed by Atkins, Dubai. The design resembles the Namaste gesture: two wings of the hotel are clasped together like hands greeting.

It would have been built in Lower Parel, Mumbai, on land previously owned by Ambika Mills. The land was acquired by the builders using redevelopment models.

See also
List of tallest buildings in Mumbai
List of tallest buildings in India

References

External links

Skyscraper office buildings in Mumbai
Buildings and structures under construction in India
Skyscraper hotels in Mumbai
W Hotels